Susan "Sue" Jane Pedersen (born October 16, 1953), also known by her married name Susan Pankey, is an American former competition swimmer, four-time Olympic medalist, and former world record-holder in two events.

As a 15-year-old, Pedersen represented the United States at the 1968 Summer Olympics in Mexico City, where she received a total of four medals.  She won a gold medal as a member of the winning U.S. team in the women's 4×100-meter medley relay, and another swimming for the first-place U.S. team in the  women's 4×100-meter freestyle relay, while setting Olympic records in both.  Individually, she received silver medals for her second-place finishes in the women's 100-meter freestyle (1:00.3), and women's 200-meter individual medley.

She held the world record in the 200-meter freestyle (2:09.5) from July 6, 1968, to August 2, 1968.  She was also a member of world-record U.S. teams in the 4×100-meter medley relay and the 4×200-meter freestyle relay.

Pedersen was inducted into the International Swimming Hall of Fame as an "Honor Swimmer" in 1995.

See also
 List of members of the International Swimming Hall of Fame
 List of Olympic medalists in swimming (women)
 World record progression 200 metres freestyle
 World record progression 4 × 100 metres medley relay

References

1953 births
Living people
American female medley swimmers
American female freestyle swimmers
World record setters in swimming
Olympic gold medalists for the United States in swimming
Olympic silver medalists for the United States in swimming
Sportspeople from Sacramento, California
Swimmers at the 1967 Pan American Games
Swimmers at the 1968 Summer Olympics
Medalists at the 1968 Summer Olympics
Pan American Games silver medalists for the United States
Pan American Games medalists in swimming
Medalists at the 1967 Pan American Games
20th-century American women